Tylobolus castaneus is a species of millipede in the family Spirobolidae. It is found in Northern California, typically between Fresno and Contra Costa.

References

Further reading 
 

Spirobolida
Animals described in 1918